MagtiCom, Ltd (Georgian: მაგთიკომი) was founded on February 12, 1996 by Dr. George (Gia) Jokhtaberidze. On September 22, 1997 the Company made the first commercial call from its mobile network. The services offered by MagtiCom involve as follows: mobile telephony; mobile internet (embracing different  technologies of mobile network development, such as: 2G, 2.5G, 3G, 3.5G, 4G, 4.5G); Cable fixed telephony (VoIP); internet television (IPTV) and fiber-optic internet. Since 2016 MagtiCom started to provide IPTV, VoIP and fiber-optic internet.

Currently, the MagtiCom mobile network unites  mobile technologies of different generations: GSM (2G and 2.5G), UMTS (3G and 3.5G HSPA+), LTE (4G, 4.5G  LTE-Advanced). These technologies are implemented on 800, 900, 1800 and 2100 MHz frequency bands.

The coverage area of "MagtiCom" network is 99% of the populated controlled territory of Georgia (with 9105 base stations). The Company is the leader of mobile market (with the 41.8% of market share; December, 2022). MagtiCom renders various services to up to 3 million customers by means of 50 customer care offices and 88 Outlets in Public Service halls. Unprecedented is the contribution of the Company to the development of Georgian economy: 2.338.763.008 lari; February 2023.
Since 2016 MagtiCom has become an ISP and, as a result, a provider of total range of communications services.

Since November, 2017 Magticom is the market leader ISP operator in Georgia.

Owners 
MagtiCom Ltd was founded on February 12, 1996 by Dr. George (Gia) Jokhtaberidze who owns 75% of the Company and exercises the full control thereover. See Chart 1 to learn about the owners and the ownership share thereof.

History

Milestones 

 September 22, 1997 – the first commercial call was made from the MagtiCom network;
 2001 – the first GPRS call was made as a result of constructing the GPRS network;
 2005 – Bali – the youth brand of MagtiCom was launched;
 2005 – MagtiCom became the owner of the operational license of CDMA 800  MHz standard;
 2006 – as a result of deployment the 3G network, the 3G services such as video call, mobile TV and high-speed internet were launched;
 2008, April – MagtiCom launched Magti Fix – the CDMA- Magti Fix was a wireless fixed telephone service based on CDMA 450 (operating on 450 MHz frequency band). In 2022 (July 29), the Magti Fix service was canceled.
 2009 – MagtiCom, on the commission of the Ministry of Education and Science of Georgia, launched, within the frame of creating the United Educational Network, the project of internatization of all the resource centers and public schools of Georgia. Having completed the layout of the network ahead of time and activated over 2,150 public schools and resource centers therein, MagtiCom has started and proceeds with rendering service to those schools and centers;  
 2010 – MagtiCom launched Bani – the third mobile brand;
 2012, January – MagtiCom launched service MagtiSat, the first operator of satellite broadcasting in Georgia and South Caucasus region providing TV service to any point in the country. In 2022 (December 31), the MagtiSat service was canceled;
 2013, December – MagtiCom offered 3 new movie channels of its own production dubbed in Georgian to the customers: Magti Hit, Magti Kino and Chveni Magti;
2015, February 1 – MagtiCom launched the 4G/LTE network covering the 92% of the populated and controlled territory of Georgia;
 2016, May 30 – MagtiCom, Ltd. and Caucasus Online LLC signed the purchase contract of operational assets;
 2016, May 31 – First in the telecommunications market of Georgia MagtiCom offered the 4.5 LTE-Advanced network;
 2016, August 1 – MagtiCom started to provide the fiber-optic internet, internet television (IPTV), fixed telephony to the retail market and hosting service, whereupon it officially became the first company in the Georgian market providing full communications service – mobile and fixed telephony, internet and television.
 2016, November 21 - MagtiCom and Deltacom have signed the Contract of purchasing the 100% share of Deltacom;
 Since November, 2017 Magticom is the market leader ISP operator in Georgia;
 According to the March 2019 statistics from the Georgian National Communications Commission, MagtiCom continues to top the charts for fiber-optic internet, television (broadcast transit), and mobile telephony;
 2018, May 2 - First in the telecommunications market of Georgia, MagtiCom launched VoLTE (Voice over Long Term Evolution) technology;
 2019, March 18 - Magti TV Play – TV APP for smartphone;
 From August 1, 2019, newest technologies in Georgia for the first time – eSIM by Magti!
 2020, On August 13, MagtiCom has started testing the 5th generation technology.
 2020, on September 22 Magti logo has been changed.
 2021, On February 12, umlaut, the global consultancy company recognizes Magticom network as the “Best in Test” in Georgia.

Mobile Telephony 
MagtiCom made the first commercial call on September 22, 1997. Currently the mobile network of MagtiCom unites the mobile technologies  of the following generations: GSM (2G and 2.5G), UMTS (3G and 3.5G HSPA+), LTE (4G, 4.5G  LTE-Advanced). These technologies are implemented on 800, 900, 1800 and 2100 MHz frequency bands.

MagtiCom is the uncontested leader in the mobile telephony market. According to the Georgian National Communications Commission statistics, as of December 2022, MagtiCom has 2,245,453 subscribers.

Internet 

MagtiCom offers 2 types of internet service: mobile internet since 2001 and fiber-optic internet for retail market since 2016.

Mobile Internet 
MagtiCom subscribers started to enjoy the WAP-based internet as far back as 2001, while in 2002 the Company offered the GPRS-based internet soon followed by HSDPA, HSPA and HSPA+ technologies. Since 2015 MagtiCom has been offering 4G LTE internet, while since May 2016 – LTE Advanced network.

According to the data of the Georgian National Communications Commission, MagtiCom enjoys the highest index of internet usage.

Fiber-Optic Internet 
Fiber-optic internet is provided via the fiber-optic network.

According to the official data, MagtiCom is leading ISP operator, with 501,229 internet subscribers as of December 2022.

Television 
MagtiCom offers IPTV since 2016.

According to the official data, MagtiCom has the leading position in the television (broadcast transit) market in Georgian. MagtiCom has 360,490 subscribers in December 2022.

IPTV: Internet Television from MagtiCom 
IPTV is a new generation TV standard based on internet protocol (IP) offering such functions as the air management, rewinding and pausing. IPTV allows to wind a program back, to stop it and to proceed with watching it from the place where it had been stopped.

TV Channels of the Company's Own Production 
In December 2013, MagtiCom started to offer 3 movie channels of its own production dubbed in Georgia: Magti Hit, Magti Kino and Chveni Magti. Since 2016 the channels have become available for the customers of Magti IPTV.

Fixed Telephony

Cable Fixed Telephony (VoIP) 
VoIP technology offers cable fixed telephone communication via internet protocol (IP). Unlike traditional telephony, here the voice signal is transferred digitally. MagtiCom started to offer cable fixed telephony to the retail market in 2016.

MagtiCom Technological Leader 

The development of internet technologies in MagtiCom in chronological order:
 2001 – 2G technology: transfer of SMS and small-volume data via WAP technology
 2002 – 2.5G technology: MMS and GPRS technology
 2006 – 3G technology: UMTS wireless broadband communication for mobile phones
 2009 – 3.5G technology – HSDPA, HSPA, HSPA+ higher-speed data transfer
 2015 – 4G technology: LTE network
 2016 – 4.5G technology or the LTE Advanced network available in Georgia for MagtiCom customers.

Base Stations of 2G, 3G and 4G Mobile 
In terms of base stations MagtiCom is a leader on Georgian market. The company owns 9105 of base stations all over Georgia.

Coverage of Mobile and Internet Networks 
As of 2021, MagtiCom covers the 99% of the inhabited and controlled territory of Georgia.

Customer Care

Customer Care Offices 
MagtiCom offers services both via its customer care offices and its hotline.

MagtiCom's 50 offices (13 in Tbilisi and 37 in the regions of Georgia) render services during week days, while a number of offices – on the week-ends as well.

Also, MagtiCom customer care offices are opened at 88 outlets in Public Service halls all over Georgia.

Hotline

MagtiCom offers 24-hour hotline service 7 days a week. The call is toll-free for MagtiCom customers.

Web-chat

The representatives of Customer Care work on the web-chat providing customers with online help/information.

Roaming 
MagtiCom offers roaming service. The list of roaming partners of the Company contains 191 countries and 441 operators.
We do it for Georgia

“We do it for Georgia" is the aegis under which MagtiCom has implemented hundreds of projects in various aspects including the ones to support Georgian culture, sport, health, arts and education. MagtiCom, being a company with corporative social responsibility, carries out a great number of social projects. Among national projects noteworthy is the publication of books/albums of the works by Georgian cultural figures. The books/albums are distributed free of charge on the presentation day. The works – books, sets of volumes and albums – by dozens of writers, poets, artists, sculptors or architects are kept at MagtiCom archive.

"Constant" the Magazine 
“Constant", the quarterly magazine from MagtiCom, started to be issued in 1999. The magazine offers MagtiCom news as well as the world examples of technological progress and other interesting information.

The full e-version of "Constant" is available on the MagtiCom web-site. The circulation of the printed version makes 25,000 copies. The magazine is free-of-charge.

“Constant" is distributed both in Tbilisi and the regions of Georgia.

MyMagti 
Since 2014, MagtiCom has been offering the application MyMagti serving as an office in the users' smartphones.

References

External links

Telecommunications companies of Georgia (country)
Telecommunications companies established in 1996
1996 establishments in Georgia (country)
Brands of Georgia (country)
Companies based in Tbilisi